Of Many Things is a half-hour panel discussion television series which aired on ABC from October 5, 1953, to January 11, 1954. It was hosted by Dr. Bergen Evans.

References

American television talk shows
1953 American television series debuts
1954 American television series endings
American Broadcasting Company original programming
Black-and-white American television shows